The 1987 European Touring Car Championship was a motor racing competition for Group A Touring Cars. It was the 25th European series for Touring cars and the 19th to carry the European Touring Car Championship name. The Drivers Championship was won by Winfried Vogt driving a BMW M3 and the Manufacturers’ Championship by the BMW Linder #47 entry.

Schedule
The championship was contested over a seven race series.

Championship Results

Drivers Championship

Manufacturers Championship

References

European Touring Car Championship seasons
European Touring